Kankal was a Bengali horror drama film directed by Naresh Mitra and produced by Shishir Mallik. This film was released on 14 April 1950 under the banner of Madhuchakra Limited. Kankal was the first horror film released in the Bengali language.

Plot
This is a revenge story of a young woman, Tarala. Tarala likes to enjoy life, she meets and marries a wealthy man Ratan. But her ex lover Abhay comes back and ruins the conjugal relationship of Tarala and Ratan. One day drunken Abhay tries to rape Tarala in a farmhouse and accidentally kills her. Tarala's vengeful spirit revives to take revenge.

Cast
 Dhiraj Bhattacharya as Abhay
 Jiben Bose as Agarwala
 Naresh Mitra as Professor
 Ketaki Dutta as Anima
 Sisir Batabyal as Dr Sanyal
 Paresh Bandyopadhyay as Ratan
 Malaya Sarkar as Tarala
 Prabha Debi as Katyayni
 Kali Sarkar
 Gita Som as Anuradha

References

External links
 

1950 films
Bengali-language Indian films
Indian horror drama films
Indian black-and-white films
1950s Bengali-language films
1950 horror films
Films directed by Naresh Mitra